Pseudomonas moraviensis is a Gram-negative soil bacterium. It is named after Moravia, the region of the Czech Republic where it was first isolated. The type strain is CCM 7280T.

References

External links
Type strain of Pseudomonas moraviensis at BacDive -  the Bacterial Diversity Metadatabase

Pseudomonadales
Bacteria described in 2006